Liz Lira is a professional salsa dancer and choreographer from Southern California. Liz has won numerous titles at the World Salsa Championships and other competitions around the world, and is best known for her work as a choreographer on several seasons of So You Think You Can Dance.

SYTYCD choreography

References

External links
Official website

American choreographers
Living people
So You Think You Can Dance choreographers
Salsa
American female dancers
American dancers
Dancers from California
Salsa dancers
Year of birth missing (living people)
21st-century American women